Veľký Krtíš (before 1927 Veľký Krtýš) is a town in middle Slovakia, situated in the historical Novohrad region. The town's most important economic sectors are mining and agriculture.

Etymology
The name is of Hungarian origin and is probably derived from the word kürtös which either means a bugler or, more likely motivated by the ethnonym Kürt (one of Magyar tribes).

History
The town was first mentioned in the second half of the 13th century, although the name Krtíš first appeared in 1245 under name Curtus (Latin). Until 1919 it was the part of the Hungarian Kingdom, later Austria-Hungary, part of the Nograd - Novohrad region. It was ruled by Ottoman Empire between 1554 and 1594 and again between 1596 and 1686 as part of Filek sanjak, its centre was Rimaszombat. After Treaty of Trianon it became part of Czechoslovakia. In the Second World War, the village remained in the Slovak state, a Nazi-Germany ally. The village suffered damages in the spring of 1945 when the Soviet army of the 2nd Ukrainian front together with the Romanian army met the Nazi Germany units. A Romanian military cemetery can be found in the nearby Modry Kamen. The village developed to a town in the 1960s with the opening of the mine for brown coal with massive industrialisation under the Communist Party. It had many industrial plants, Liaz; a large vehicular plant had a large plant in the until the 1990s on the outskirts towards Maly Krtris. The former Liaz plant is now owned by a Turkish investment firm producing luxury vehicle parts for various automobile companies like Aston Martin, Land Rover and Jaguar.

Geography

Demographics
In May 2017 the town had 11,657 inhabitants. According to the 2011 census 86.93% of inhabitants were Slovaks, 6.20% Hungarians, 2.06% Roma and 0.78% Czechs. The religious make-up was 54.26% Roman Catholics, 21.58% people with no religious affiliation and 16.00% Lutherans.

Twin towns — sister cities

Veľký Krtíš is twinned with:
 Písek, Czech Republic

References

External links
 
 

Villages and municipalities in Veľký Krtíš District
Cities and towns in Slovakia